Sebadoris is a genus of sea slugs, dorid nudibranchs, shell-less marine gastropod mollusks in the family Discodorididae.

Species
Species in the genus Sebadoris include:

References
 

Dorididae